China is a nation that has competed at the Hopman Cup tournament on two occasions, their debut coming at the 18th annual staging of the tournament in 2006, when they lost to the Netherlands in the qualification play-off.

China also participated a number of times in the now defunct Asian Hopman Cup, a qualifying tournament which ran from 2006 until 2009 and granted the winners entry into the Hopman Cup the following year. China participated every year and each time failed to progress past the round robin stage of the event

Players
This is a list of players who have played for China in the Hopman Cup.

Results

References

Hopman Cup teams
Hopman Cup
Tennis, Hopman Cup